Humberto Francisco Filizola Haces (born 2 February 1950) is a Mexican former professor and politician affiliated with the Institutional Revolutionary Party. Between 2003 and 2006, he served as deputy of the LIX Legislature of the Mexican Congress, representing his hometown of Ciudad Victoria, Tamaulipas. He had previously served as the rector of the Autonomous University of Tamaulipas (UAT), between 1991 and 2003.

Oddly, Filizola had a short-lived career as a professional football player for Correcaminos, the team representing the university of which he was the incumbent rector. On the last matchday of the 1993–94 Mexican Primera División season, he appeared for 29 minutes against Club América before being substituted. Although he almost managed to score a goal at one point, he and manager Jesús Bracamontes were lampooned by the press. Filizola, who was 44 years old at the time, defended his participation, saying that he had wanted to give an example of hard work and courage to the youth from Tamaulipas.

References

1950 births
Living people
People from Ciudad Victoria
Politicians from Tamaulipas
Footballers from Tamaulipas
Members of the Chamber of Deputies (Mexico) for Tamaulipas
Institutional Revolutionary Party politicians
Autonomous University of Tamaulipas alumni
Academic staff of the Autonomous University of Tamaulipas
Heads of universities and colleges in Mexico
Mexican footballers
Correcaminos UAT footballers
Liga MX players
21st-century Mexican politicians
Association football forwards
Deputies of the LIX Legislature of Mexico